Kurt Russ (born 23 November 1964) is an Austrian football coach and a former player.

Club career
Russ began his playing career with his home town club of FC Langenwang and later moved on to Kapfenberger SV. During his professional club career he played for First Vienna, FC Swarovski Tirol and LASK Linz. He finished his career at SC Schwanenstadt to become player/coach.

International career
Russ' international debut came in the 1–0 victory over Denmark on 27 April 1988. Under Josef Hickersberger's management of the Austrian national side, Russ was an almost permanent fixture appearing in the starting line ups of 27, out of a possible 31, internationals. The culmination of which was the 1990 FIFA World Cup. Hickersberger's departure issued in the era of Alfred Riedl as national coach, which saw a decline in Russ's use. His final international was a June 1991 European qualification match, like his debut game also against Denmark.

Coaching career
More recently he has been the trainer with SC Schwanenstadt and from the summer of 2007 until March 2008 he was head coach of Vorwärts Steyr. He was the head coach of Kapfenberger SV from 2013 until 2016.

External links

References

1964 births
Living people
People from Mürzzuschlag District
Footballers from Styria
Austrian footballers
Association football defenders
Austria international footballers
1990 FIFA World Cup players
First Vienna FC players
FC Wacker Innsbruck players
LASK players
Kapfenberger SV players
Austrian football managers
Austrian Football Bundesliga managers
SK Vorwärts Steyr managers
Kapfenberger SV managers
TSV Hartberg managers
FC Swarovski Tirol players
FC Tirol Innsbruck players